William F. Bolger (March 13, 1923 – August 21, 1989) was the 65th Postmaster General of the United States from March 15, 1978 to January 1, 1985. He was born in Waterbury, Connecticut. Bolger served in the United States Army Air Forces during World War II. He took courses in accounting at George Washington University. He was the second career postal employee to attain the rank of Postmaster General. After leaving the Postal Service, he served as president of the Air Transport Association of America.

The Bolger Conference Center in Potomac, Maryland is named after Postmaster General Bolger.

References

United States Postmasters General
1923 births
1989 deaths
People from Waterbury, Connecticut
United States Army Air Forces soldiers
Military personnel from Connecticut
George Washington University School of Business alumni
Carter administration personnel
Reagan administration personnel
United States Army Air Forces personnel of World War II